Stratum corneum chymotryptic enzyme (kallikrein 7, SCCE, KLK7, PRSS6, hK7) is an enzyme. This enzyme catalyses the following chemical reaction

 Cleavage of proteins with aromatic side chains in the P1 position

This enzyme has wide substrate specificity.

References

External links 
 

EC 3.4.21